Kreppel is a surname. Notable people with the surname include:

 Amie Kreppel, American political scientist 
 Paul Kreppel (born 1947), American actor and director

See also
 Berliner (doughnut)